Francesco Arrigua O.M. (1615 – 12 November 1690) was a Roman Catholic prelate who served as Bishop of Nicotera (1670–1690).

Biography
Francesco Arrigua was born in Monforte, Italy in 1615 and ordained a priest in the Order of the Minims.
On 6 October 1670, he was appointed during the papacy of Pope Clement X as Bishop of Nicotera.
On 19 October 1670, he was consecrated bishop by Benedetto Odescalchi, Cardinal-Priest of Sant'Onofrio, with Domenico de' Marini, Titular Archbishop of Teodosia, and Tommaso d'Aquino, Bishop of Sessa Aurunca, serving as co-consecrators. 
He served as Bishop of Nicotera until his death on 12 November 1690.

References 

17th-century Italian Roman Catholic bishops
Bishops appointed by Pope Clement X
1615 births
1690 deaths